A medical patent may refer to

 a biological patent (see also gene patent)
 a chemical or pharmaceutical patent
 a patent on a medical device
 Second medical indication, a patent claim for a new use of a known pharmaceutical

See also 

 Generic drug
 Patent medicine